The Sinner is an American police procedural anthology television series developed by Derek Simonds for USA Network. It is named after Petra Hammesfahr's 1999 novel, which served as the basis for the first season. Bill Pullman stars as a police detective who investigates crimes committed by unlikely culprits and attempts to uncover their motivations. Only Pullman appears in every season, while the rest of the cast mostly changes for each season's story.

Intended as an eight-part miniseries, The Sinner premiered to critical acclaim and high ratings. The show's success led to USA Network turning it into an anthology series, which aired for four seasons from August 2, 2017, to December 1, 2021.

The first season of The Sinner received nominations for the Golden Globe Award for Best Miniseries or Television Film and Best Actress – Miniseries or Television Film for Jessica Biel. Biel was also nominated for a Primetime Emmy Award for Outstanding Lead Actress in a Limited Series or Movie.

Premise
In the first season, Detective Harry Ambrose delves into the past of Cora Tannetti, a troubled woman, to determine why she stabbed a man to death.

In the second season, Ambrose returns to his hometown after a young boy named Julian Walker confesses to poisoning a couple and learns secrets that the inhabitants are determined to keep buried.

In the third season, Ambrose investigates a fatal car accident in Upstate New York and uncovers a much larger and disturbing case behind it.

In the fourth and last season, the now-retired Ambrose travels to northern Maine to recover from the previous case. A tragedy occurs there involving the daughter of a prominent family, and he is recruited to help the investigation.

Cast

Main 
 Bill Pullman as Harry Ambrose, a police detective
 Brady Jenness portrays the young Harry Ambrose in season 2
 Jessica Hecht as Sonya Barzel (seasons 3–4), an artist whom Harry begins dating in season 3

Season 1 
 Jessica Biel as Cora Tannetti
 Christopher Abbott as Mason Tannetti
 Dohn Norwood as Dan Leroy (guest season 2), a police detective
 Abby Miller as Caitlin Sullivan, a police sergeant

Season 2 
 Elisha Henig as Julian Walker
 Carrie Coon as Vera Walker
 Hannah Gross as Marin Calhoun
 Natalie Paul as Heather Novack, a police detective
 Tracy Letts as Jack Novack

Season 3 
 Matt Bomer as Jamie Burns, an expectant father and Dorchester resident who seeks Harry's support after an accident
 Parisa Fitz-Henley as Leela Burns, Jamie's wife who is expecting their first child
 Eddie Martinez as Vic Soto, a Dorchester police detective who helps Harry on the case
 Chris Messina as Nick Haas, Jamie's friend from college

Season 4
 Alice Kremelberg as Percy Muldoon
 Michael Mosley as Colin Muldoon
 Frances Fisher as Meg Muldoon
 David Huynh as CJ Lam
 Cindy Cheung as Stephanie Lam
 Ronin Wong as Mike Lam
 Neal Huff as Sean Muldoon

Recurring

Season 1
 Joanna Adler as Anne Farmer, a police captain
 Danielle Burgess as Maddie Beecham
 Patti D'Arbanville as Lorna Tannetti, Mason's mother
 Kathryn Erbe as Fay Ambrose, Harry's wife
 Enid Graham as Elizabeth Lacey, Cora's mother
 Jacob Pitts as J.D. Lambert
 C. J. Wilson as William Lacey, Cora's father
 Nadia Alexander as Phoebe Lacey, Cora's sister
 Rebecca Wisocky as Margaret Lacey, Cora's aunt
 Eric Todd as Frankie Belmont, a beach-goer stabbed to death by Cora
 Robert Funaro as Ron Tannetti, Mason's father
 Grayson Eddey as Laine Tannetti, Cora's son

Season 2
 Ellen Adair as Bess McTeer, one of Julian's victims
 Adam David Thompson as Adam Lowry, one of Julian's victims
 David Call as Andy "Brick" Brickowski, an officer working with Heather
 Jay O. Sanders as Tom Lidell, the police department's chief
 Allison Case as Rosemary Ambrose, Harry's mother
 Brennan Brown as Lionel Jeffries
 Maceo Oliver as Garrett, the manager of the boys' home where Julian is held in protective custody

Season 3
 Layla Felder as Emma Hughes, Jamie's student
 Leslie Fray as Melanie, Harry's daughter
 Luke David Blumm as Eli, Harry's grandson

Season 4
 Joe Cobden as Lou Raskin, Hanover Island's chief of police
 Kim Roberts as Greta

Episodes

Season 1 (2017)

Season 2 (2018)

Season 3 (2020)

Season 4 (2021)

Production

Development
The series, described as a "close-ended series" by the network, was adapted from the novel of the same name by Petra Hammesfahr; however, the book's darker outlook was toned down and the location shifted from Germany to Upstate New York in the United States. It is the first time that Biel has served as an executive producer on a series, a role she said was "gold". Biel stated that she moved into production so that she could develop projects with challenging and interesting roles rather than wait for them to happen.

The series was ordered on January 17, 2017, and the eight episodes were broadcast on USA Network between August 2 and September 20, 2017. Originally, the series was created as a miniseries; however, in March 2018, it was announced that The Sinner would return for a second season. The second season premiered on August 1, 2018, comprised eight episodes and concluded on September 19, 2018. On March 6, 2019, USA Network renewed the series for a third season. which premiered on February 6, 2020. On June 15, 2020, USA renewed the series for a fourth season, which premiered on October 13, 2021. On November 17, 2021, it was reported the fourth season would be its last.

Music
The main song featured in the first-season storyline is "Huggin and Kissin" by Big Black Delta.

Casting
In May 2018, Carrie Coon, Natalie Paul and Hannah Gross were cast for the second season as Vera, Heather and Marin respectively. During the third season renewal, it was announced that Matt Bomer would star in the third season. On August 16, 2019, Jessica Hecht, Parisa Fitz-Henley, and Eddie Martinez were cast in starring roles for the third season. On March 17, 2021, Alice Kremelberg was cast for the fourth season as Percy Muldoon, a member of a fishing family who faces a tragedy. On April 21, 2021, Michael Mosley joined the cast as a new series regular for the fourth season. On June 9, 2021, Cindy Cheung, David Huynh, Ronin Wong, and Neal Huff were cast as series regulars for the fourth season.

Filming locations
The series is primarily filmed in New York state; various towns were used in the first season to depict the fictional Dorchester in New York. The exterior of the Mt. Pleasant Justice Court building in Valhalla, New York, was used for the Dorchester police building.

The fictional Beverwyck Club in the first season was filmed at the Belvedere Estate, a private residence surrounded by forest in Tarrytown, New York. The production used some of the rooms, the basement, the Agora House building, and the wooded area on the property. Some filming for the first season was also completed in Summerville, South Carolina, and in North Charleston, South Carolina. The county jail scenes were filmed at the former county detention center in St. George, South Carolina, 30 miles from Summerville. At that time, the first episode was still considered to be the pilot for the series.

The hamlet of Purchase, New York, was used to film "a sizeable chunk" of the second season; one location is the Cobble Stone Restaurant. The Pier 701 Restaurant & Bar in the village of Piermont, New York, was used for some filming in the first season. Some filming was completed at Prospect Point in Niagara Falls, New York; Bill Pullman was included in those scenes.

In the third season, Dorchester is specified as being "by the Hudson River in Somerset County". The third season was mainly filmed in New York State, especially in the town of Hartsdale, New York, in Westchester County. Some filming for the third season was completed at the Hartsdale train station, rebranded as Dorchester. Crews were also filming in summer 2019 at Hastings-on-Hudson, New York, at the Found Herbal Apothecary Herb shop, and at the Hastings Center Diner. A car chase was shot in Queens, New York, and scenes set at the fictional Briarton school were shot at the Synod of Bishops Russian Church on East 93rd Street. Other New York City locations included the STK Midtown Steakhouse and the City College of New York, both in Manhattan.

The fourth season began filming in late April 2021 in Nova Scotia  and wrapped in August 2021. Most of the town and harbor scenes were shot in Lunenburg, Nova Scotia.

Reception

Critical response

Season 1
Critics acclaimed the first season and praised Biel's performance. On the review aggregator website Rotten Tomatoes, the season has an approval rating of 91% based on 41 reviews, with an average rating of 6.6/10. The site's critical consensus reads, "Smartly unpredictable and led by powerful performances from a talented cast, the darkly compelling The Sinner sinks its hooks in fast and doesn't let go." Metacritic, which assigns a rating to reviews, gave the series an average weighted score of 71 out of 100, based on 23 critics, indicating "generally favorable reviews". It was the number one new cable series of 2017, according to Nielsen delayed viewing data.

Season 2
A 97% approval rating for the second season was reported by Rotten Tomatoes, with an average rating of 7.54/10 based on 33 reviews, and a critical consensus reading, "In its second season, The Sinner establishes itself as an engrossing why-dunnit thriller series with staying power." Metacritic assigned a score of 75 out of 100 based on 16 critics for the second season, indicating "generally favorable reviews".

Once again praising the writing and performances, several critics noted that the follow-up season surpassed expectations, as star Jessica Biel's character did not return from the first season.

Alex McLevy of The A.V. Club wrote a rave review of the first few episodes, in particular the performance of Carrie Coon as the mysterious Vera Walker. McLevy wrote that the second season could be even better than the first, noting, 
"Two things keep it from feeling like a rehash of season one: the excellent choices in new narrative twists made by writer-creator Derek Simonds, and the caliber of talent involved in bringing it to life. Chief among the latter group is Carrie Coon, who ... brings a wonderful fusion of frazzled humanism and sinister duplicity to the part, another magnetic performance by the actor that elevates the material and lends gravitas to some of the more daffily implausible turns."

Ben Travers of indieWire wrote, 
"Derek Simonds assembled a helluva team for an intriguing follow-up season. The first three episodes of Season 2 match the tone and intensity of the writer's gripping debut, while new cast members Tracy Letts, Natalie Paul, and Carrie Coon more than make up for any holes left by the original cast. ... Season 2 has enough going on it could spin off the rails, but the mere fact it has so much working for it thus far is a big win for everyone involved. The Sinner is no one-hit wonder."

Season 3
On Rotten Tomatoes, the third season has an approval rating of 85% with an average rating of 7.28/10 based on 13 reviews. Metacritic has assigned a score of 81 out of 100 based on five critics for the third season, indicating "universal acclaim".

Season 4

On Rotten Tomatoes, the fourth season has an approval rating of 86% with an average rating of 7.8/10 based on 13 reviews.

Ratings

Season 1

Season 2

Season 3

Season 4

Awards and nominations

Notes

References

External links
 
 

2010s American police procedural television series
2010s American LGBT-related drama television series
2010s American mystery television series
2010s American crime drama television series
2020s American police procedural television series
2020s American LGBT-related drama television series
2020s American mystery television series
2020s American crime drama television series
2017 American television series debuts
2021 American television series endings
American thriller television series
English-language television shows
Incest in television
Lesbian-related television
Serial drama television series
Television series by Universal Content Productions
Television shows based on German novels
Television shows set in New York (state)